Antonius von Steichele (22 January 1816 – 9 October 1889) was Bishop, and later Archbishop of the Archdiocese of München und Freising from 1878 until 1889.

Biography
Born 22 January 1816 in Mertingen, he was ordained on 28 August 1838, aged 22 as Priest Priest of Augsburg, Germany by Bishop Pankratius von Dinkel.

On 30 April 1878, aged 62, he was appointed Archbishop of the Archdiocese of München und Freising, confirmed three months later and installed accordingly.

On 9 October 1889, aged 73, he died. He had been a priest for 51 years and a bishop for 11 years.

External links
Catholic Hierarchy

1816 births
1889 deaths
Roman Catholic archbishops of Munich and Freising
19th-century Roman Catholic archbishops in Germany
Members of the Bavarian Reichsrat
Burials at Munich Frauenkirche
German Roman Catholic archbishops